Starksia robertsoni, the Robertson's blenny, is a species of labrisomid blenny native to the Caribbean coast of Panama and Islas de Las Dos Hermanas near Portobelo. It was previously known as Starksia lepicoelia, and is also closely related to Starksia weigti and Starksia williamsi. It is named after D. Ross Robertson, a scientist from Smithsonian Institution.

References

robertsoni
Taxa named by Carole C. Baldwin
Taxa named by Benjamin C. Victor
Taxa named by Cristina I. Castillo
Fish described in 2011